is a Japanese actor and musician. He has appeared in more than sixty films since 1984. He formerly belonged to the entertainment company Cream International.

Career
Hakuryu is a second-generation Korean resident of Japan (zainichi), whose real name is Jun Jung-il. He formed and played in an amateur band in high school and later started the Hakuryu band in 1978 with the aim of becoming a professional musician, making his debut with the single EP  released in 1979. With a harshness and solemnity that most young people don't possess, and an outlaw-like quality that coexists inside and out, he began his career in 1984 with Yoichi Sai's theatrical film Someone Will Be Killed, and although his main focus has been on yakuza films and V-Cinema, he has appeared in such films as Takeshi Kitano's Violent Cop.

Currently, he has many roles in yakuza films as the number two of an organization, such as a young leading subordinate, with the characters being ruthless, cold-hearted schemers. His first anime voice acting performance was in Kaiji: Ultimate Survivor, where he played the role of Yukio Tonegawa. He also wrote, composed and performed the ending theme for the series, .

He often wears sunglasses in the media and also designs sunglasses for the "Hakuryu" brand. He appeared on 13 July 2014 episode of "ARIYOSHI'S Meeting for Reviewing" (Nippon TV) and reflected on the fact that he likes sunglasses too much. His house was also shown to the public, where his extreme love for sunglasses was shown on-air.

Selected filmography

References

External links 

1952 births
Living people
Japanese male film actors
Zainichi Korean people
Japanese male actors of Korean descent
People from Imari, Saga
Actors from Saga Prefecture